The Maine Black Bears represented University of Maine in Women's Hockey East Association during the 2015–16 NCAA Division I women's ice hockey season.

Offseason
July 1: The Maine Black Bears led Women's Hockey East with 19 named to the WHEA All-Academic All-Star Team.

Recruiting

Roster

2015-16 Black Bears

Schedule

|-
!colspan=12 style=""| Regular Season

|-
!colspan=12 style=""| WHEA Tournament

Awards and honors

Alyson Matteau named to WHEA All-Rookie Team

References

Maine
Maine Black Bears women's ice hockey seasons
2015 in sports in Maine
2016 in sports in Maine